Flamengo de Ngagara is a football (soccer) club based in Bujumbura, Burundi. They competed in the Burundi Premier League in 2008 and 2009.

External links
Team profile – soccerway.com

Football clubs in Burundi